"Stone" is the debut and winner's single by  Cyrus, the series seven winner of The X Factor Australia. It was released digitally on 24 November 2015 as the lead single from his self-titled debut album. The song debuted at number four on the ARIA Singles Chart. The music video was released on 12 December 2015.

Background and release
"Stone" was written by TMS and Bobby Andonov. After winning The X Factor, "Stone" was released for digital download in Australia on 24 November 2015, as Cyrus's debut and winner's single. The song was released as a CD single three days later.

For the issue dated 30 November 2015, "Stone" debuted at number four on the ARIA Singles Chart from two days of sales.

Live performances
Cyrus performed "Stone" live for the first time during The X Factor grand final performance show on 23 November 2015. He performed the song again during the grand final decider show the following day, after he was announced as the winner, where he told the audience; "I want to thank God for blessing me with the gift of music that I've been so blessed to share with you all."

Charts

Certifications

Release history

References

2015 songs
2015 debut singles
Sony Music Australia singles
Songs written by Ben Kohn
Songs written by Peter Kelleher (songwriter)
Songs written by Tom Barnes (songwriter)
Songs written by Sean Douglas (songwriter)